Shelkovskoy District (Şelkovskan khoşt) is an administrative and municipal district (raion), one of the fifteen in the Chechen Republic, Russia. It is located in the northeast of the republic. Its administrative center is the rural locality (a stanitsa) of Shelkovskaya. Population:  50,233 (2002 Census);  The population of Shelkovskaya accounts for 20.8% of the district's total population.

References

Notes

Sources

Districts of Chechnya